Stewart Richard Davison (born 6 April 1991) is an English first-class cricketer.

Davison made his debut in minor counties cricket for Berkshire against Norfolk in the 2010 MCCA Knockout Trophy, as well as making his Minor Counties Championship debut in the same year against Herefordshire. While studying at Oxford Brookes University, he played first-class cricket in two matches for Oxford MCCU in 2013 against Warwickshire and Worcestershire. As of 2019, Davison has played fifty Minor Counties Championship matches for Berkshire, alongside 31 MCCA Knockout Trophy matches, and eight matches in the minor counties 20-over competition.

References

External links

1991 births
Living people
Alumni of Oxford Brookes University
Berkshire cricketers
Cricketers from Basingstoke
English cricketers
Oxford MCCU cricketers
People educated at The Oratory School